This is a list of French film directors.

A–B

 Mona Achache
 Gabriel Aghion
 Alexandre Aja
 Jean-Gabriel Albicocco
 Marc Allégret
 Yves Allégret
 Jean-Baptiste Andrea
 Jean-Jacques Annaud
 Olivier Assayas
 Alexandre Astruc
 Jacques Audiard
 Jacqueline Audry
 Jean Aurel
 Claude Autant-Lara
 Serge Avedikian
 Gaël Aymon
 Géla Babluani
 Charles le Bargy
 Jacques de Baroncelli
 Jean-Marc Barr
 Jean-Louis Barrault
 Jacques Becker
 Jean Becker
 Jean-Jacques Beineix
 Yannick Bellon
 Yamina Benguigui
 Raymond Bernard
 Claude Berri
 Luc Besson
 Bruno Bianchi
 Enki Bilal
 Alice Guy-Blaché
 Michel Blanc
 Bertrand Blier
 Romane Bohringer
 Michel Boisrond
 Patrick Bokanowski
 Bertrand Bonello
 Bernie Bonvoisin
 Rachid Bouchareb
 Laurent Boutonnat
 Jean-Christophe Bouvet
 Sarah Bouyain
 Jean-Pierre Bouyxou
 Jean Boyer
 Gérard Brach
 Catherine Breillat
 Robert Bresson
 Jean-Claude Brialy
 Philippe de Broca
 Charles Burguet
 Alexandre Bustillo
 José Bénazéraf

C–E

 Marcel Camus
 Guillaume Canet
 Laurent Cantet
 Leos Carax
 Christian Carion
 Marcel Carné
 Marc Caro
 Emmanuel Carrère
 Yves Caumon
 André Cayatte
 Claude Chabrol
 Jacques Charon
 Étienne Chatiliez
 Patrice Chéreau
 Segundo de Chomón
 Élie Chouraqui
 Christian-Jaque
 Yves Ciampi
 Jean-Paul Civeyrac
 René Clair
 René Clément
 Henri-Georges Clouzot
 Jean Cocteau
 Henri Colpi
 Alain Corneau
 Catherine Corsini
 Edgardo Cozarinsky

 Guy Debord
 Camille Delamarre
 Jean Delannoy
 Benoît Delépine
 Denis Delestrac
 Louis Delluc
 Richard Dembo
 Jacques Demy
 Claire Denis
 Jacques Deray
 Arnaud Desplechin
 Michel Deville
 Henri Diamant-Berger
 William Kennedy Dickson
 Albert Dieudonné
 Vincent Dieutre
 Arielle Dombasle
 Germaine Dulac
 Bruno Dumont
 François Dupeyron
 Marguerite Duras
 Julien Duvivier
 Christine Edzard
 Robert Enrico
 Jean Epstein
 Jean Eustache

F–J

 Henri de la Falaise
 Ismaël Ferroukhi
 Louis Feuillade
 Jacques Feyder
 Georges Franju
 Guy du Fresnay
 Abel Gance
 Christophe Gans
 Nicole Garcia
 Philippe Garrel
 Louis J. Gasnier
 Tony Gatlif
 Costa Gavras
 Julie Gavras
 Daniel Gélin
 Xavier Gens
 Bernard Giraudeau
 Francis Girod
 Jean-Luc Godard
 Michel Gondry
 Jean-Pierre Gorin
 Jean-Paul Goude
 Pierre Granier-Deferre
 Jean Grémillon
 Paul Grimault
 Stéphan Guérin-Tillié
 Sacha Guitry
 Paul Gury
 Alice Guy-Blaché
 Lucile Hadžihalilović
 Roger Hanin
 Mia Hansen-Løve
 Philippe Harel
 Christophe Honoré
 Robert Hossein
 André Hugon
 André Hunebelle
 Marcel Ichac
 Jean Image
 Otar Iosseliani
 Aline Issermann
 Luc Jacquet
 Benoît Jacquot
 Just Jaeckin
 Agnès Jaoui
 Sébastien Japrisot
 Jean-Christophe Jeauffre
 Jean-Pierre Jeunet
 Roland Joffé

K–M

 William Karel
 Mathieu Kassovitz
 Peter Kassovitz
 Cédric Klapisch
 Nicolas Klotz
 Gérard Krawczyk
 Diane Kurys
 Adonis Kyrou
 Marcel L'Herbier
 George Lacombe
 Jean-Daniel Lafond
 René Laloux
 Albert Lamorisse
 Rémi Lange
 Claude Lanzmann
 Jacques Lanzmann
 Denys de La Patellière
 Pascal Laugier
 Georges Lautner
 Yves Lavandier
 Louis Le Prince
 Patrice Leconte
 Claude Lelouch

 René Leprince
 Louis Leterrier
 Sébastien Lifshitz
 Auguste and Louis Lumière
 Sarah Maldoror
 Louis Malle
 Sophie Marceau
 Maurice Mariaud
 Chris Marker
 Jean-Pierre Marois
 Christian Marquand
 Tonie Marshall
 Léon Mathot
 Julien Maury
 Nicolas Maury
 Georges Méliès
 Jean-Pierre Melville
 Michel Mitrani
 Radu Mihăileanu
 Claude Miller
 Alexandre Michon
 Noël Mitrani
 Serge Moati
 Jean-Pierre Mocky
 Léonide Moguy
 Édouard Molinaro
 Gregory Monro
 Bruno Monsaingeon
 Gaël Morel
 Luc Moullet
 Mr. Oizo
 Musidora

N–R

 Raphael Nadjari
 Jules and Gedeon Naudet
 Gaspar Noé
 Bruno Nuytten
 Marcel Ophüls
 Gérard Oury
 François Ozon
 Marcel Pagnol
 Jean Painlevé
 Euzhan Palcy
 Jean-Marie Pallardy
 Philippe Parreno
 Christine Pascal
 Alain Payet
 Max Pécas
 Robert Péguy
 Vincent Pérez
 Léonce Perret
 Jacques Perrin
 Maurice Pialat
 Claude Pinoteau
 Gérard Pirès
 Pitof
 Jean-Marie Poiré
 Léon Poirier
 Roman Polanski
 Jean-Daniel Pollet
 Henri Pouctal
 Eugene Py
 Philippe Ramos
 Alex Ranarivelo
 Bernard Rapp
 Jean-Paul Rappeneau
 Jean Renoir
 Alain Resnais
 Jacques Rivette
 Alain Robbe-Grillet
 Yves Robert
 Éric Rochant
 Charles de Rochefort
 Éric Rohmer
 Jean Rollin
 Frédéric Rossif
 François Rotger
 Brigitte Roüan
 Gaston Roudès
 Jacques Rouffio
 Henry Roussell
 Jacques Rozier
 Alexandre Ryder

S–Z

 Jean-Paul Salomé
 Lucia Sanchez
 Claude Sautet
 Suzanne Schiffman
 Pierre Schoendoerffer
 Barbet Schroeder
 Céline Sciamma
 Partho Sen-Gupta
 Serge Ankri
 Coline Serreau
 Marius Sestier
 Delphine Seyrig
 Florent Emilio Siri
 Ramzi Ben Sliman
 George Sluizer
 Nicole Stéphane
 Straub-Huillet
 Ramata-Toulaye Sy
 Charlotte Szlovak
 Jeannot Szwarc
 Jihan El-Tahri
 Jacques Tati
 Bertrand Tavernier
 André Téchiné
 Virginie Thévenet
 Danièle Thompson
 Daniel Tinayre
 Laurent Tirard
 Jacques Tourneur
 Maurice Tourneur
 Tran Anh Hung
 Coralie Trinh Thi
 Nadine Trintignant
 François Truffaut
 Roger Vadim
 Eric Valli
 Charles Vanel
 Agnès Varda
 Marcel Varnel
 Flore Vasseur
 Anton Vassil
 Francis Veber
 Paul Vecchiali
 Henri Verneuil
 Sandrine Veysset
 Jean Vigo
 René Viénet
 Régis Wargnier
 Alexis Wajsbrot
 André Weinfeld
 Sylvain White
 Anne Wiazemsky
 Ferdinand Zecca
 Ariel Zeitoun
 Claude Zidi
 Rebecca Zlotowski
 Erick Zonca

See also

 Cinema of France
 List of French people

External links
 Some notes on each director

Lists of film directors by nationality
Film directors
Directors